This article lists the squads for the 2022 Turkish Women's Cup, the 5th edition of the Turkish Women's Cup. The cup consists of a series of friendly games, and is held in Turkey from 16 to 22 February 2022. The six national teams involved in the tournament registered a squad of 23 players.

The age listed for each player is on 16 February 2022, the first day of the tournament. The numbers of caps and goals listed for each player do not include any matches played after the start of tournament. The club listed is the club for which the player last played a competitive match prior to the tournament. The nationality for each club reflects the national association (not the league) to which the club is affiliated. A flag is included for coaches that are of a different nationality than their own national team.

Squads

Bulgaria
Coach: Silviya Radulska

The squad was announced on 14 February 2022.

Latvia
Coach: Romāns Kvačovs

The squad was announced on 10 February 2022. Alise Gaiķe withdrew and was replaced by Kristiāna Zacmane.

Lithuania
Coach: Rimantas Viktoravičius

The squad was announced on 12 February 2022.

Ukraine
Coach:  Lluís Cortés

The squad was announced on 8 February 2022. Olha Basanska withdrew from the squad and was replaced by Yana Derkach.

Uzbekistan
Coach:  Midori Honda

Venezuela
Coach:  Pamela Conti

The 23-player squad was announced on 11 February 2022. The following week it was announced that Nayluisa Cáceres withdrew due to a leg injury and Daniuska Rodríguez withdrew due to a positive COVID-19 result. They were replaced by Zhenia Liendo and Raiderlin Carrasco.

Player representation

By club
Clubs with 4 or more players represented are listed.

By club nationality

By club federation

By representatives of domestic league

References

2022